Koly Kanté (born 11 November 1982 in Bamako) is a Malian football (soccer) defender. Kanté has a French passport and currently plays for Belasitsa Petrich after signing a contract in January 2008. He is a right back/midfielder.

External links 

1982 births
Living people
Malian footballers
Association football defenders
Angoulême Charente FC players
Tours FC players
Association football utility players
JS Centre Salif Keita players
Sportspeople from Bamako
UA Cognac players
Mali international footballers
21st-century Malian people